The River Kennett is a river that runs through Suffolk and Cambridgeshire in eastern England.

Course

The River Kennett rises in the hills just west of Cowlinge Hall in western Suffolk at an altitude of around 108m above sea level. It flows north-east to the village of Cowlinge before turning west for around a mile, crossing the county border into Cambridgeshire in the parish of Kirtling. After only a couple of miles in Cambridgeshire it crosses back into Suffolk just north of Lidgate and flows north through Dalham and Moulton. At Kentford it forms the Suffolk-Cambridgeshire border for around a mile followed by a mile in Cambridgeshire just north of the village of Kennett, after which it again forms the county border for around three miles as it runs past Red Lodge.

As it reaches Freckenham, it joins Lee Brook, a tributary of the River Lark, just south of Freckenham, at an altitude of around 10m. The river is generally dry in the summertime.

Water level

In recent years (since 2015) the river level has been very low, even in winter. Where it runs through the Lidgate/Ousden/Dalham areas, the river has been dry in winter. It has only been the presence of the sewage treatment works between Dalham and Moulton that has meant any water has flowed through Moulton in recent years, whether winter or summer. Thankfully, in early December 2019 the river in the above areas began to flow again, albeit only as a stream, thanks to much rain.

This was not always the case, in the winter of 2013–4, there was extreme flooding. In Moulton on 7 February 2014 the river overflowed onto the road by the church and at one stage houses were threatened.

History

The villages of Kentford and Kennett both derive their names from the river. The name of the river is Celtic in origin, and its meaning is unknown.

The exact course of the river has changed many times over the centuries. Some evidence of this can be inferred from its deviations from the Kennett parish boundary.

At Moulton the river passes under a Grade-II*-listed 15th-century packhorse bridge. This bridge has four arches, indicating that the river was larger when the bridge was constructed.

References

External links

Rivers of Suffolk
Rivers of Cambridgeshire